The Tuneful Trolley was an American psych-pop sextet from the late 1960s. Originally a high school band called "The Mark of Quality" from Suffolk County, Long Island, they were discovered and renamed by Sandy Yaguda of Jay and the Americans. Yaguda helped the band sign with Capitol Records and produced their first and only album, Island in the Sky.

Island in the Sky 

Their 1968 album has been called sunshine pop and psychedelic pop. The first eleven tracks were released in their original LP in vinyl. The track list below reflects Cherry Red Records's Now Sounds division's re-release of the album in 2008 with mono mixes of four singles released after the record.

Personnel 
 Bass, Backing Vocals – B. Parks
 Directed By [Music Director] – Jerry Vance
 Drums, Backing Vocals – J. Riolo
 Engineer – Stan Bright
 Horns – "Elephant Memory" is Myron Elephant, Stanley Elephant*
 Lead Guitar, Backing Vocals – S. Ciccarello
 Lead Vocals, Keyboards - J. DeSane
 Liner Notes – Jay and The Americans
 Keyboards, Backing Vocals – P. Conocenti
 Producer – Sandy Yaguda
 Rhythm Guitar, Backing Vocals – A. Bordonaro

Members 
 Anthony (Tony) Bordonaro (guitar, vocals)
 Brian Parks (bass, vocals)
 Jack Riolo (drums, vocals)
 Joey DeSane (Keyboard, Lead vocals) 
 Paul Conocenti (organ, vocals)
 Santo Ciccarello (guitar, vocals)

Discography 
 Island in the Sky (1968) 
 Sunny Days / My Apple Pie (1968)
 Hello Love / Written Charter (1968)

References 

Psychedelic pop music groups